Tobar is a surname. Notable people with the surname include:

Armando Tobar (1938–2016), Chilean soccer player
Daniella Tobar, Chilean television actress
Francisco Tobar García (1928–1997), Ecuadorian writer, diplomat and professor
Irene Tobar (born 1989), Ecuadorian soccer player
Julio César Tobar (born 1978), Colombian soccer player
Luis Alberto Luna Tobar, (1923–2017), Ecuadorian Roman Catholic prelate
Rafael Tobar (born 1975), Salvadoran soccer player
Roberto Tobar (born 1978), Chilean soccer referee
RusherKing, (born 2000 AS Thomas Tobar) Argentine rapper
Whiquitta Tobar, American lawyer and former college basketball player 

Spanish-language surnames